Parliamentary elections were held in the Federated States of Micronesia on 6 March 2007, alongside a double referendum. Thirty-five candidates competed for the fourteen seats in Congress. As there were no political parties, all candidates ran as independents.

In the referendums voters were asked whether they approved of two proposed amendments to the constitution, both of which had been put forward in 2005 and rejected. These would give the states credit for their acts, and lift the ban on dual citizenship. The proposed amendments required a 75% majority in at least three of the four states. However, whilst both proposals were approved by a majority of voters, the 75% threshold was only passed in Kosrae.

Results

Congress

Referendums

States

Dual citizenship

References

External links
Thirty five candidates certified for 2007 national elections Government of the Federated States of Micronesia

Elections in the Federated States of Micronesia
2007 elections in Oceania
Parliamentary election
2007 referendums
Referendums in the Federated States of Micronesia